XHHY-FM is a radio station on 93.9 FM in Querétaro, Querétaro. The station is owned by Respuesta Radiofónica and carries a pop format known as Mía 93.9.

History
XHHY began as XEHY-AM 1310, located in Villa Corregidora and owned by Trigio Javier Pérez de Anda. Pérez de Anda is the president of Radiorama and the son of founder Javier Pérez de Anda.

In the early 2010s operation of the station was transferred to Respuesta Radiofónica, after it migrated to FM. The concession was ceded to Foro Radial in 2015.

References

Radio stations in Querétaro